The Orbiel Aqueduct is one of several aqueducts on the Canal du Midi. Until its building, the canal crossed the River Orbiel on the level. A dam on the Orbiel was demolished and replaced with the Aqueduct.

See also
Locks on the Canal du Midi

References

External links
Photograph on Flickr
Photograph on Flickr
Photograph on canalmidi.com
Photograph on versatel.nl

Aqueducts on Canal du Midi